Tobias Reinhardt (born 31 August 1971) is a German classical scholar, specialising in Latin literature and ancient philosophy. Since 2008, he has been the Corpus Christi Professor of Latin at the University of Oxford and a Fellow of Corpus Christi College, Oxford.

Early life and education
Reinhardt was born on 31 August 1971 in Gross-Gerau, West Germany. He was educated at Kronberg-Gymnasium Aschaffenburg. He then studied Latin and Ancient Greek at the University of Frankfurt, where he completed the Staatsexamen. In 1997, he matriculated into Corpus Christi College, Oxford to undertake postgraduate studies in classical philology. His doctoral supervisors were Michael Frede and Michael Winterbottom. He completed his Doctor of Philosophy (PhD) degree in 2000 with a thesis titled "A commentary on Cicero's 'Topica'".

Academic career
During Trinity Term of the 2000/2001 academic year, Reinhardt was a college lecturer in classical philosophy at New College, Oxford and in Latin literature at Corpus Christi College, Oxford. For the 2001/2002 academic year, he was a junior research fellow in ancient philosophy at Merton College, Oxford. In 2002, he was elected a Fellow of Somerville College, Oxford, where he was also tutor in Latin and Ancient Greek. He was additionally a university lecturer in classical languages and literature in the Faculty of Classics, University of Oxford between 2002 and 2008. In 2008, he was appointed Corpus Christi Professor of Latin, and as such was elected a Fellow of Corpus Christi College, Oxford.

Selected works

References

 

 
 
 

1971 births
Living people
German classical scholars
Corpus Christi Professors of Latin
Fellows of Corpus Christi College, Oxford
People from Groß-Gerau
Goethe University Frankfurt alumni
Alumni of Corpus Christi College, Oxford
Fellows of Merton College, Oxford
Fellows of Somerville College, Oxford